was a Japanese cyclist. He competed in the individual pursuit and team pursuit events at the 1964 Summer Olympics. In 1984, Yamafuji, along with his wife and children, committed suicide in their home in Toride. Their suicides are believed to have been due to financial difficulties.

References

1944 births
1984 suicides
Japanese male cyclists
Olympic cyclists of Japan
Cyclists at the 1964 Summer Olympics
Joint suicides
Suicides in Japan